Hampton Neil Dansie  (born 2 July 1928) is a former first-class cricketer and long-term administrator for South Australia.

Early life
Nicknamed "Nodder" due to his habit of nodding in agreement when in conversation, Dansie was born in Nuriootpa, South Australia, the grandson of Sam Dansie, a leading country cricketer who represented a Broken Hill team against the touring Marylebone Cricket Club side. Dansie moved to Adelaide with his family as a child and excelled in a wide range of sports, including cricket, Australian rules football and baseball. He made his first grade cricket debut for Kensington Cricket Club aged 15, one of the youngest ever debutants in the South Australian Grade Cricket League. His football career also developed, making his senior debut for Norwood Football Club in the South Australian National Football League (SANFL) in 1946. Dansie played 39 games for Norwood before retiring in 1949, aged just 21, in order to concentrate on his cricket.

In January 1949 Dansie was the last player to bat with Don Bradman in an official match, when Bradman played his final innings for Kensington against Port Adelaide Cricket Club at Alberton Oval. When Bradman was given out caught behind on 38, the large crowd booed the umpire and promptly adjourned to the neighbouring Alberton Hotel.

First-class cricket
Dansie made his first-class cricket debut on 27 January 1950 on the WACA Ground against Western Australia, making 36 and 13. Dansie quickly gained a reputation as a hard-hitting batsman with a liking for the pull, sweep and cut shots and a steady off-spin and leg-spin bowler, as well as being known as one of the great characters of South Australian cricket, including gaining the title of being the world's fastest eater. Dansie's best batting performance was 185 against Queensland at the Gabba in January 1951 and took five wickets for 61 against Queensland in December 1960.

Lancashire League
In 1955, Dansie signed with Lancashire League club Todmorden (for £550) on the advice of former Australian Test cricketer and Bacup Cricket Club professional Arthur Richardson. In his first season Dansie made 800 runs and took 44 wickets. Re-signed by Todmorden for the 1956 season, Dansie remained in England in 1955/56 and worked at Alf Gover's indoor cricket centre, coaching children who hadn't played cricket before, experience which Dansie later used as a coach in South Australia. In the 1956 Lancashire League season Dansie made 713 runs and scored 67 wickets. A popular figure in Todmorden, Dansie was offered another contract but, having married Gwenda, Dansie returned to South Australia.

Cricket administration
Dansie retired from first-class cricket in 1967, after 124 matches and was awarded honorary membership of the South Australian Cricket Association. Following his retirement, Dansie turned to coaching and administration, coaching the Norwood reserves, South Australian Amateur Football League (SAAFL) team Payneham, the SAAFL state team and the All-Australian amateur team. Additionally, Dansie and his wife founded the Newton Jaguars Netball Club.

In 1976 Dansie was made a selector for the South Australian senior cricket side and all its under-age and women's teams, serving for 30 years. Dansie also served on the SACA board for 25 years, on the City of Campbelltown council and as president of the Australian Sportsmen's Association. Dansie also found time to work for the South Australian Education Department, including many years as the bursar at Norwood Morialta High School.

Honours
Dansie was known as "The Patriarch of South Australian cricket", and the Neil Dansie Trophy for South Australia's most valuable player each season is named in his honour. He and his former teammate Les Favell are honoured in the Favell-Dansie Indoor Centre at the southern end of Adelaide Oval, behind the Sir Donald Bradman Stand. In 1991 he was awarded the Order of Australia Medal for services to sport.

References

1928 births
Living people
Australian cricketers
Australian cricket coaches
South Australia cricketers
Norwood Football Club players
Kensington cricketers
Australian rules footballers from Adelaide
Australian cricket administrators
Cricketers from Adelaide
People from Nuriootpa, South Australia
Recipients of the Medal of the Order of Australia
Sportsmen from South Australia
Australian expatriate cricketers in the United Kingdom
Australian expatriate sportspeople in England